Gotthold Salomon (born as Schlomo Salman ben Lippmann haLewi; November 1, 1784 in Sandersleben (Anhalt-Dessau) – November 17, 1862 in Hamburg) was a German Jewish rabbi, politician and Bible translator.
 
Following on the work of Moses Mendelssohn, Salomon was the first Jew to translate the complete Old Testament into High German, under the title Deutsche Volks- und Schulbibel für Israeliten (1837) ("German People's and School Bible for Israelites"). He served as preacher in the Hamburg Temple, and partook in the public dispute around it in 1841.

References

External links

 Digitized works by Gotthold Salomon at the Leo Baeck Institute, New York

1784 births
1862 deaths
Translators of the Bible into German
Levites
19th-century German rabbis
Hebrew–German translators
Jewish translators of the Bible
Jews from Hamburg
German male non-fiction writers
19th-century German translators